Ultimate Paradise was a Ghanaian tv series that was aired in the early 1990 – 2000.

Cast
George Williams
Rama Brew
Psalm Adjetefio
Omanza Eugene Shaw
Michelle Attoh

References

Ghanaian television series
2000s Ghanaian television series
1990s Ghanaian television series